Events in the year 2010 in Ukraine.

Incumbents 

 President: Viktor Yushchenko (until 25 February), Viktor Yanukovych (from 25 February)
 Prime Minister: Yulia Tymoshenko (until 4 March), Oleksandr Turchynov, (from 4 March until 11 March), Mykola Azarov (from 11 March)

Events 

 12 October – A train collides with a passenger bus on a railroad level crossing at Marhanets, Dnipropetrovsk Oblast, killing 43 people, making collision was the worst single road accident in the country's history by number of victims.

Deaths 
 4 September – Oleksandra Bandura, teacher and literature scholar (b. 1917).

References 

 
Ukraine
Ukraine
2010s in Ukraine
Years of the 21st century in Ukraine